In the state of New South Wales, Australia, there are many areas which are commonly known by regional names. Regions are areas that share similar characteristics. These characteristics may be natural such as the Murray River, the coastline, or the Snowy Mountains. Alternatively, the characteristics may be cultural, such as a viticulture land use. New South Wales is divided by numerous regional boundaries, based on different characteristics. In many cases boundaries defined by different agencies are coterminous.

Local government

In New South Wales on the third tier of elected government after the federal and state governments are the local government authorities, which are responsible for the local government areas. The types of LGAs in New South Wales are cities, municipalities, shires and regions.

New South Wales has more than 150 local government areas which have an elected council and carry out various functions delegated to them by the Government of New South Wales.

Australian Bureau of Statistics

The Australian Bureau of Statistics has moved towards a new Geographical Classification called the Australian Statistical Geography Standard. Geography is now divided into Statistical Area Level 1, 2, 3, and 4.  Statistical Area Level 4 is the highest (regions of a State) and Statistical Area Level 1 being the lower (Mesh blocks are more refined but not readily available apart from the Census of Population and Housing).

For older statistics, such as the 2006 Census of Population and Housing, the Australian Bureau of Statistics has multiple regional structures for which it analyses and reports data. These regional structures derive from the Australian Standard Geographical Classification (AGSC). The AGSC defines at the very smallest level, the Census Collection District (CCD). These CCD's aggregate to form the Statistical Local Area (SLA), which is the common base unit for each of the larger regional structures. The boundaries of the SLA are designed to be typically coterminous with Local Government Areas unless the LGA does not fit entirely into a Statistical Subdivision (SSD), or is not of a comparative nature to other LGA's. Bureau of Statistics provides statistics for Local Government Areas, as well as three other statistical structures: Statistical Divisions, Statistical Regions, and Statistical Districts.

Statistical Divisions
Statistical Divisions (SD) form the main structural hierarchy of statistical analysis. These regions are structured to provide a broad range of social, demographic and economic statistics. The basis for the boundary delineations center on socioeconomic criteria. The thirteen divisions for New South Wales are:
Central West, Far West, Hunter, Illawarra, Mid-North Coast, Murray, Murrumbidgee, North Western, Northern, Off-Shore Areas & Migratory, Richmond-Tweed, South Eastern, Sydney

Statistical Regions
The Statistical Region (SR) structure was established in 1986 as a means for labor force analysis.
Sydney: Canterbury-Bankstown, Central Northern Sydney, Central Western Sydney, Eastern Suburbs, Fairfield-Liverpool, Gosford-Wyong, Inner Sydney, Inner Western Sydney, Lower Northern Sydney, North Western Sydney, Northern Beaches, Outer South Western Sydney, St George-Sutherland
Balance of New South Wales: Central West, Far West-North Western, Hunter, Illawarra, Mid-North Coast, Murray-Murrumbidgee, Northern, Richmond-Tweed, South Eastern

Statistical Districts
The Statistical District (SDist) is a non-capital, urban region of one or more adjoining areas, with a population of 25,000 or more. The SDist is defined with consideration of a 20-year growth forecast. The SDist does not need to conform to LGA boundaries or to state territory boundaries. The thirteen Statistical Districts in New South Wales are:
Newcastle, Wollongong, Nowra-Bomaderry, Bathurst-Orange, Lismore, Coffs Harbour, Port Macquarie, Tamworth, Dubbo, Wagga Wagga, Albury-Wodonga (New South Wales and Victoria), Gold Coast-Tweed (New South Wales and Queensland), Canberra-Queanbeyan (New South Wales and the Australian Capital Territory)

Biogeographic regions

The Interim Biogeographic Regionalisation for Australia (IBRA) is a biogeographic regionalisation of Australia; divided into 89 bioregions and 419 subregions. Each region is a land area made up of a group of interacting ecosystems that are repeated in similar form across the landscape. Regions and subregion cross state and territory boundaries. The bioregions that are located within all or part of New South Wales include:
 Australian Alps (part)
 Brigalow Belt South (part)
 Broken Hill Complex (part)
 Channel Country (part)
 Cobar Peneplain
 Darling Riverine Plains (part)
 Flinders Lofty Block (part)
 Mulga Lands (part)
 Murray Darling Depression (part)
 Nandewar (part)
 New England Tablelands
 NSW North Coast
 NSW South Western Slopes (part)
 Riverina (part)
 Simpson Strzelecki Dunefields (part)
 South East Corner (part)
 South Eastern Highlands (part)
 South East Queensland (part)
 Southern Volcanic Plain (part)
 Sydney Basin (Cumberland Plain)

Informal divisions

New South Wales is also informally divided into a smaller number of regions.  These regions have no general administrative function or status.  Many of them are only vaguely defined, or are defined in different ways for different purposes. For example, departments of the New South Wales government, such as the New South Wales Police Force, or the Ministry of Health, define regions of the State for their own internal administrative purposes. These regions may be defined in completely different ways, as shown by the maps in the references.

The original basis for descriptive regional names in New South Wales is based on the geography of the State.

The State can be divided into four components:
 the coastal regions fronting the Tasman Sea in the east of the State
 the highlands which form part of the Great Dividing Range
 the western (inland) slopes of the highlands, which form the main agricultural region of the State
 the arid western plains

These four components are then typically divided into north, central and southern components based upon their location relative to Sydney.

This two-way subdivision gives rise to the generic pattern of regions, and in some cases, subregions:

Specific uses of regions for different purposes

Weather forecasting

The Australian Bureau of Meteorology divides New South Wales into sixteen districts.

 Northern Rivers
 Mid North Coast
 Hunter
 Northern Tablelands
 Sydney Metropolitan
 Illawarra
 South Coast
 Central Tablelands
 Southern Tablelands
 Snowy Mountains
 North West Slopes & Plains
 Central West Slopes & Plains
 South West Slopes
 Riverina
 Lower Western
 Upper Western

New South Wales Government

Department of State and Regional Development
The Department of State and Regional Development lists fourteen regions in New South Wales.
Far South Coast, Central Coast, Central West, Greater Western Sydney, Far West, The Hunter, Illawarra, Mid North Coast, Murray, New England - North West, Northern Rivers, Orana, Riverina, and Sydney

Office of Local Government
The Office of Local Government listed twelve regions:
Central West, Mid North Coast, North Western, Far West, Murray, Richmond Tweed, Hunter, Murrumbidgee, South Eastern, Illawarra, Northern, and Sydney Surrounds

Local governments in New South Wales have created regional groupings. The NSW Regional Organisations of Councils, typically with names like "Western Sydney Regional Organisation of Councils" (WSROC) have the main function of lobbying the State Government on various matters, coordinating economic development, joint purchasing between councils and regional promotion. They have no formal administrative function. There are thirteen networks of regional organisation, in addition to the six networks in Greater Metropolitan Sydney:
Canberra Region, Central NSW, Far North West, Far South West, Hunter, Illawarra Shoalhaven, Mid North Coast, Namoi, New England, Northern Rivers, Orana, Riverina and Murray, and Riverina.
Shore Region, Central Coast Region, Macarthur Region, Northern Sydney Region, Southern Sydney Region, Western Sydney Region, Sydney Coastal.

Department of Planning
The Department of Planning, Industry and Environment divides New South Wales into ten regions:
Greater Sydney, Central Coast, Hunter, Illawarra Shoalhaven, North Coast, New England North West, Central West and Orana, South East and Tablelands, Riverina-Murray and Far West.

Ministry of Health

The New South Wales Ministry of Health divided New South Wales into fifteen separate regions, called Local Health Districts.  These are:

 Metropolitan Local Health Districts
 Central Coast
 Illawarra Shoalhaven
 Nepean Blue Mountains
 Northern Sydney
 South Eastern Sydney
 South Western Sydney
 Sydney
 Western Sydney
 Rural & Regional NSW Local Health Districts
 Far West
 Hunter New England
 Mid North Coast
 Murrumbidgee
 Northern NSW
 Southern NSW
 Western NSW

Additionally, a small number of non-geographic specialty networks cover paediatric health, justice and forensic health, and the St' Vincent's Health network.

New South Wales Police Force

The New South Wales Police Force is organised into approximately 81 local area commands, which are aggregated into six regions:

 Central Metro Region
 North West Metro Region
 Northern Region
 South West Metro Region
 Southern Region
 Western Region

New South Wales National Parks and Wildlife Service

The NSW National Parks & Wildlife Service uses the Interim Biogeographic Regionalisation for Australia bioregions based on ecological factors.  These bioregions extend into neighbouring States.

Australia travel

Yet another subdivision of New South Wales into regions is as follows:

 Sydney
 Central Coast
 Hunter
 Blue Mountains
 Southern Highlands
 Snowy Mountains
 Illawarra
 South Coast
 Capital Country (similar to Southern Tablelands in other lists)
 Northern Rivers
 North Coast NSW (which is actually what other lists call the Mid North Coast)
 New England North West (Northern Tablelands and North West Slopes)
 Central New South Wales
 Riverina
 The Murray
 Outback New South Wales

This classification subdivides the most commonly accepted notion of "The Riverina" into two separate regions, "Riverina" and "The Murray".

See also

 Regions of Sydney
 Regional Organisations of Councils
 NSW Regional Organisations of Councils
 Western Sydney Regional Organisation of Councils

References

External links
 Map of NSW weather forecasting zones - website
NSW Department of Local Government Directory - Regional Organisations of Councils.
WSROC website - example of a regional organisation of councils.
 Map of Health NSW regions - NSW Health Department website
 NSW Police regions
Department of State and Regional Development Regions
National Parks Bioregions - website
 Description of bioregions - website
 About Australia Travel - website

 
Geography of New South Wales